Zarechye is a rural locality (a selo) in Filippovskoye Rural Settlement, Kirzhachsky District, Vladimir Oblast, Russia. The population was 292 as of 2010. There are 13 streets.

Geography 
Zarechye is located on the left bank of the Sherna River, 39 km southwest of Kirzhach (the district's administrative centre) by road. Ratkovo is the nearest rural locality.

References 

Rural localities in Kirzhachsky District
Pokrovsky Uyezd